Govinda Bahadur Manandhar, popularly known as Dhooswan Sayami (1930-2007) was a Nepali  writer, who wrote primarily in Nepal Bhasa. He also wrote in Hindi and Nepali. He is well known for his contribution to the field of prose fiction. He is considered the first novelist in Nepal Bhasa.

Biography
He was born on 24 May 1930 (10 Jestha 1987 BS) in Jhochhen, Kathmandu to father Narayan Bahadur Manandhar and mother Daan Maya Manandhar. He belongned to a wealthy business family of Nepal which had principal business in Gaur. He was the first child of his parents. He obtained a Master's degree in Culture from Banaras Hindu University. He changed his firstname to Dhoowsan ( flower of dust in Nepal Bhasa) and famil name to Sayami (a slur name for people for Manandhar).

He was one of the founding members of Chosaspasa (Newar writers' organization) and president of the Sahityakar Samsad. He was well known academically and also had some diplomatic tenure.

Published work
His published work include
Misā (Nepal Bhasa) - was awarded by Chosaspasa
Matina (Nepal Bhasa)
Gaṃkī (Nepal Bhasa) - translated into English as The Eclipse and into Nepali as Ganki
Deepa (Novel)
Palpasa (Novel)
Fiswa (Novel)
Lis (Novel)
Agati (Novel)
Nibha (Novel)
Disha (Novel)
Triveni (Play)
Hraun Mikha (Play)

Awards and honours 
He is the lead character in Amrita Pritam's novel titled Adalat. He is considered the first novelist in Nepal Bhasa.

Awards received:

 Mahendra Bidhya Bibhosan
 Prabal Gorkha Dakshin Bahu
 Madhuparka Samman

Ganki-Basundhara award and Janamat-Deepa award were established in his honour.

Personal life 
He was married to Basundhara Sayami. They had 5 children (4 sons and 1 daughter). He died on 17 December 2007.

References

Living people
Newar-language writers
Hindi-language writers
Nepali-language writers from Nepal
Nepalese male novelists
20th-century Nepalese male writers
1930 births